Alfred Cheney Johnston
 Baker Art Gallery
 Bruno Bernard
 Cecil Beaton
 Elliott & Fry 
 George Hurrell
 James J. Kriegsmann
 José Maria Mora
 Léopold-Émile Reutlinger
 Maurice Seymour (pseudonym: Maurice Zeldman (1900-1993) and Seymour Zeldman (1902-1995)), both changed their names to 'Maurice Seymour' when Seymour moved from Chicago to New York.
 Meade Brothers Photographers, 233 Broadway near Astor house, New York.  Established 1840.
 Nadar
 
 Tony Bruno (photographer), signed his work: "Bruno of Hollywood, NYC"
 J Wood, Photo. 208 Bowery, New York

References

External links 
 19th Century Actors and Theater Photographs, University of Washington Libraries

Theatrical photographers